PS Duke of Connaught was a paddle steamer passenger vessel operated by the London and North Western Railway and the Lancashire and Yorkshire Railway from 1875 to 1893.

References

1875 ships
Passenger ships of the United Kingdom
Steamships
Ships built in Barrow-in-Furness
Ships of the Lancashire and Yorkshire Railway
Ships of the London and North Western Railway
Paddle steamers of the United Kingdom